Beauty Flash is a Hong Kong based Thoroughbred racehorse.

In the season of 2009–2010, Beauty Flash wins the HKG1 Mercedes-Benz Hong Kong Derby. He also is one of the nominees of Hong Kong Horse of the Year.

Profile
 Sire: Golan
 Dam: Wychwood Rose
 Sex: Gelding
 Country : 
 Colour : Chestnut
 Owner : Kwok Siu Ming 
 Trainer : Tony Cruz
 Record : (No. of 1-2-3-Starts) 9-2-5-41 (As of 18 May 2015)
 Earnings :  HK$30,792,000 (As of 18 May 2015)

References

 The Hong Kong Jockey Club – Beauty Flash Racing Record
 The Hong Kong Jockey Club

Racehorses bred in New Zealand
Racehorses trained in Hong Kong
Hong Kong racehorses